Mir Mohammad Nasiruddin is a Bangladesh Nationalist Party politician and a former State Minister of Civil Aviation and Tourism.

Career
Nasiruddin served as the State Minister of Civil Aviation and Tourism in the Second Khaleda Cabinet. He was the Four-party Alliance candidate in the 2005 Chittagong Mayoral election. He was defeated by the incumbent Mayor A. B. M. Mohiuddin Chowdhury of the Bangladesh Awami League. He is an adviser of Bangladesh Nationalist Party Chairperson and former Prime Minister of Bangladesh, Khaleda Zia. On 5 May 2017, he met the chief Hefazat-e-Islam Bangladesh, Shah Ahmad Shafi, at Hathazari Madrasa, Chittagong.

Corruption
On 12 July 2007, Nasiruddin was jailed by a special Anti-Corruption court for corruption along with his son Mir Mohammed Helal Uddin for 13 years. Bangladesh High Court nullified the sentences in August 2010. On 3 July 2014, Bangladesh Supreme Court scrapped the High Court order that acquitted him of all charges.

References

Living people
Bangladesh Nationalist Party politicians
State Ministers of Tourism and Civil Aviation (Bangladesh)
Year of birth missing (living people)
Place of birth missing (living people)